161st Street is a short, major thoroughfare in the southern portion of the Bronx. The 20th-century Yankee Stadium was on the south side of the street. The road begins in the west at an intersection with Jerome Avenue, a major thoroughfare in the Bronx, and Woodycrest Avenue, a one-way street in the Bronx. The road is one of the widest in the Bronx, until the Sheridan Avenue intersection, where the divided highway merges. East 161st Street ends at Elton Avenue. However, the road continues eastward in parts, ending at Hewitt Place, as a short connector.

History 
East 161st Street was Cedar Street from the Harlem River to Grand Concourse. It was named after a property built in 1840 called "The Cedars". In the village of Melrose, East 161st was known as William Street. From Third Avenue to Prospect Avenue, East 161st Street was known as Grove Hill and was renamed later as Cliff Street.

Description 
East 161st Street begins at an intersection with Woodycrest Avenue and Jerome Avenue in the Bronx. The road passes a parking lot to the south and crosses under the Macombs Dam Bridge soon after. After the intersection with Ruppert Place, East 161st passes the south side of Yankee Stadium. Just after Yankee Stadium, River Avenue crosses over East 161st Street. At this intersection is the only subway station on East 161st Street. East 161st is then split by a median used for parking. Grand Concourse, a major thoroughfare in the Bronx intersects soon after, ending the divided highway system on East 161st Street. After the Melrose Avenue intersection, the first section of East 161st Street comes to an end as the road continues as Elton Avenue. The second section of East 161st, a one-way street in the opposite direction. The section begins at an intersection with Third Avenue, intersects with Brook Avenue, and makes a curve to the south as Washington Avenue. The third section of East 161st Street begins at Third Avenue, just south of the second section. This one is a half-mile, stretching from Third Avenue to Prospect Avenue. The final, easternmost section begins at an intersection at Westchester Avenue and ends at Hewitt Place, a short connector.

Transportation 

There is one subway station along the whole length of West/East 161st Streets. It is located at the intersection of River Avenue and West/East 161st Streets. The second part was opened in 1933 for the IND Concourse Line. These are the only subway stations for Yankee Stadium.

Two bus lines run along 161st Street. The first is the Bx6 and the second is the Bx13. There was also a Bx49, which was merged with the Bx13 in 1984.

See also 
161st Street (Manhattan)

References 

Streets in the Bronx